Nicolas Petan (born March 22, 1995) is a Canadian professional ice hockey centre currently playing for the Iowa Wild in the American Hockey League (AHL) while under contract to the Minnesota Wild in the National Hockey League (NHL). Petan was selected by the Winnipeg Jets in the second round, 43rd overall, of the 2013 NHL Entry Draft.

Playing career

Amateur
As a youth, Petan played in the 2007 and 2008 Quebec International Pee-Wee Hockey Tournaments with a minor ice hockey team from North shore.

Petan, who played in the Western Hockey League (WHL) beginning in the 2010–11 season with the Portland Winterhawks, was rewarded for his outstanding performance in the 2012–13 season by being named to the 2013 WHL West First All-Star Team. Petan led the WHL with 74 assists, and shared the overall points title with Brendan Leipsic, finishing with 120 points in 68 games. Petan scored 9 goals with 19 assists in 21 playoff games and was +13 with 16 penalty minutes. The Winterhawks reached the 2013 Memorial Cup championship game, losing 6–4 to the Halifax Mooseheads. Petan scored one goal and nine assists and was +1 in five Memorial Cup games.

In the 2013–14 season, Petan had 35 goals and led the WHL with 78 assists, finishing +47 with 69 penalty minutes. Portland finished first in the U.S. Division and reached the WHL Finals for the fourth straight year. The Winterhawks lost to the eventual Memorial Cup champions, the Edmonton Oil Kings. Petan scored 7 goals with 21 assists and was +7, with 38 penalty minutes in 21 playoff games.

In December 2013, Petan signed a three-year, entry-level contract with the Winnipeg Jets. In 2014–15, Petan returned to the Winterhawks for his final year of junior eligibility and finished with 89 points in the regular season and another 28 points in the playoffs.

Professional
After finishing major junior hockey, Petan immediately jumped to the NHL, starting the 2015–16 season with the Winnipeg Jets. He scored a goal in his NHL debut for the Jets on October 8, 2015, against Tuukka Rask of the Boston Bruins. On November 19, 2015, he was reassigned to the Jets' American Hockey League (AHL) affiliate, the Manitoba Moose. On March 17, 2016, the Jets recalled Petan.

Petan made the Jets' opening night roster for the 2017–18 season, but was reassigned to the Moose after playing in six games. He scored at a point-per-game pace with Manitoba, registering 15 goals and 37 assists in 52 games. He was recalled to the Jets on two occasions finishing with 2 goals in 15 games. On August 1, 2018, following the completion of his entry-level contract earlier in the off-season, Petan was signed as a restricted free agent to a one-year, two-way extension with the Jets.

Petan, now waiver eligible, began the 2018–19 season with the Jets. He played sparingly for the Central Division-contending Jets, appearing in just 13 games approaching the trade deadline before he was traded to the Toronto Maple Leafs in exchange for Pär Lindholm on February 25, 2019. On March 21, Petan signed a two-year contract extension with the Leafs.

On July 28, 2021, the Vancouver Canucks signed Petan to a one-year, two-way contract worth $750,000 at the NHL level.

At the conclusion of his contract with the Canucks, Petan left as a free agent and signed his first contract with an American team, agreeing to a two-year, two-way contract with the Minnesota Wild on July 13, 2022.

International play

At the 2012 Ivan Hlinka Memorial Tournament, Petan helped Canada's under-18 team win the gold medal. During the 2013–14 season, he represented the WHL in the Subway Series, then played for Canada's under-20 team at the 2014 World Junior Ice Hockey Championships. He was invited back to represent Canada at the 2015 World Junior Ice Hockey Championships, where he was instrumental in Canada's gold medal win, including scoring a hat-trick against Slovakia in the semi-final.

Personal life
Petan was born on March 22, 1995 in Delta, British Columbia to mother Rosanna and father Franc. Nic has an older brother who is also a hockey player, Alex. His father committed suicide on September 18, 2018.

Career statistics

Regular season and playoffs

International

Awards and honours

References

External links

1995 births
Living people
Abbotsford Canucks players
Canadian ice hockey centres
Canadian people of Italian descent
Ice hockey people from British Columbia
Iowa Wild players
Manitoba Moose players
Minnesota Wild players
People from Delta, British Columbia
Portland Winterhawks players
Toronto Maple Leafs players
Toronto Marlies players
Vancouver Canucks players
Winnipeg Jets draft picks
Winnipeg Jets players
Canadian expatriate ice hockey players in the United States